Taney may refer to:

 Taney (Vouvry, Switzerland), a hamlet
 Taney Parish, a Church of Ireland community in south Dublin, Ireland
 Taney County, Missouri, United States
 , a United States Coast Guard cutter
 , a United States Liberty Ship
 Roger B. Taney (1777–1864), U.S. Attorney General and Chief Justice
 Lac de Taney, Switzerland
 Taney Seamounts, a range of underwater volcanoes

See

Toney, surname